The Embassy of Peru in Korea is the diplomatic representation of Peru in South Korea. The current Peruvian ambassador to South Korea is Daúl Matute Mejía.

Peru and South Korea established relations in 1963, elevating them to embassy level one year later and maintaining them since. Peru opened an embassy in Seoul in July 1967, and South Korea opened an embassy in 1971.

See also
Embassy of South Korea, Lima

References

Peru
Seoul
Peru–South Korea relations